Gaston Thierry (born 17 July 1866 in Munich, † 16 September 1904 near Mubi) was a German officer and civil servant in Togo and Cameroon.

Life
Thierry was the son of a tradesman. After attending the Gymnasium, he joined the Infantry Regiment No. 88 in 1886. In the same year, he became Portepee-Fähnrich (ensign with sword-knot) and in 1887 Sekondeleutnant (second lieutenant). In 1891 he retired from the army and became a member of the First See-Bataillon. In 1894, after the suppression of the mutiny of the police force, he was temporarily ordered to Cameroon. In 1894 he was promoted to first lieutenant. He resigned on 12 September 1895 from the Marine Infantry and entered into the Grenadier Regiment of King Frederick William II (1st Silesian) No. 10.

In June 1896 he was made à la suite of the regiment and ordered to serve at the Foreign Office. Thierry was first used in German-Togo, where he served as station director of Sansanné-Mango and district manager in Yendi, and was involved in the occupation of the north. He led several military expeditions against local communities, including the Kabiye in January 1898 together with Hermann Kersting and Valentin von Massow, and one against the Moba in 1899. 

In 1902 he was transferred to the German colonial territory in Cameroon, stationed first in Victoria and after his promotion to captain (12 September 1902) in 1903 was appointed head of the station in Yaoundé. In 1903 he accompanied Governor Jesko von Puttkamer on his trip to Chad and on this occasion was appointed first Resident of the colonial province of Adamawa on 20 September 1903.

Death and legacy 
Thierry was mortally wounded in an expedition he led against Jeremia Issa and his followers in Mubi. He died succumbing from a poisoned arrow on 16th September 1904. He was buried in Garoua.

A year after his death, in 1905, the case of Thierry's brutality against Africans was brought back to the spotlight as parliamentary debates on colonial affairs took place after several scandals involving officers and missionaries in German-Togo hit the headlines in the German press. The official parliamentary indulgence stipulated that Captain Thierry had shot down the father of the pupil of the Catholic mission in Lomé, after he had climbed up a tree to flee from the officer. Furthermore, the pupil reported that Thierry would shoot down local people as one would shoot game, and that his acts of cruelty were grounds for his notoriety in the entire protectorate.

A species of West African lizard, Chalcides thierryi, was named in his honor.

References

Sources 

Ergebnisse der Untersuchung über den Tod des Hauptmanns Thierry, in: Deutsches Kolonialblatt 16 (1905), p. 161 (in German).
Manfred Maximilian Ulbrich: Offizier-Stammliste des Grenadier-Regiments König Friedrich Wilhelm II. (1. Schlesischen) Nr. 10 1808-1908, Berlin 1907, p. 499f. (in German).

Prussian Army personnel
Togoland
German colonial people in Kamerun
1904 deaths
1866 births